Pupella Maggio (born Giustina Maria Maggio) (24 April 1910 – 8 December 1999) was an Italian film actress.

Life and career
Born in Naples into a family of actors, Maggio debuted on stage aged twelve years old, as the sidekick of her brother Beniamino. She later worked with several companies, including the ones led by Rina Morelli and by Eduardo De Filippo, where after the death of Titina De Filippo she inherited most of her roles. 

Maggio also appeared in several films, winning the Nastro d'Argento Award for Best Supporting Actress for her performance in Luigi Zampa's Be Sick... It's Free.

Filmography

References

External links 
 
 Massimo Colella, Profilo biografico di attori partenopei del XX secolo: IV. Pupella Maggio, 2022 (https://www.centrostuditeatro.it/2022/03/pupella-maggio/).

1910 births
1999 deaths
Italian film actresses
Actresses from Naples
Nastro d'Argento winners
20th-century Italian actresses
Burials at the Cimitero Flaminio